Subzin-Liessow station is a railway station in the Subzin-Liessow district in the municipality of Laage, located in the Rostock district in Mecklenburg-Vorpommern, Germany.

References

Laage
Railway stations in Mecklenburg-Western Pomerania
Buildings and structures in Rostock (district)
Rostock S-Bahn stations